Asociația Sportivă Orășenească Buhuși was a Romanian football club from Buhuși, Bacău County, which played in Liga IV Bacău.

The club was founded in 2007 by Toader Șteț and Adrian Păduraru, with financial support of the Buhuși City Hall and Buhuși Local Council in order to try to ensure the continuity of the football tradition in Buhuși after Textila Buhuși was dissolved, a club with tradition in romanian football. ASO Buhuși was dissolved in 2010.

League history

Former managers
 Gheorghe Chivorchean
 Toader Șteț

References

Defunct football clubs in Romania
Football clubs in Bacău County
Association football clubs established in 2007
Association football clubs disestablished in 2010
2007 establishments in Romania
2010 disestablishments in Romania